Tow (rhymes with "cow") is a small unincorporated community in Llano County, Texas, United States. Its population was 1,249 at the 2010 census.
 
Tow was once a thriving community, until the central Texas drought that started in 2007. It then lost about half of its population, forcing many businesses to shut down.

As of 2018, Tow is more active now that the lake is full, and businesses once shut down have begun to reopen.

Geography

Climate
The climate in this area is characterized by hot, humid summers and generally mild to cool winters.  According to the Köppen climate classification, Tow has a humid subtropical climate, Cfa on climate maps.

History
Tow, which is the oldest community in the county, began with the arrival in 1852 of David and Gideon Cowan and their mother, Ruth, originally from Tennessee. The Cowans were directed by local Indians to a salt bed near the Colorado River, which they developed into a successful saltworks. Significant not only in the local economy, the Bluffton-Tow Salt Works was also known as the Confederate States of America Salt Works for its contribution to the Confederate cause. The operation was destroyed by the "salt works cyclone" in 1871. John F. Morgan arrived in the area with his family in 1853 and soon established a hat business, using beaver and other fur trapped locally. When the Tow brothers, William and Wilson, arrived with their families in 1853, they named the nearby area in which they settled Tow Valley. A post office was established there in 1886 as Tow with Mathew B. Clendenen as postmaster. Tow grew rapidly in the 1970s and 1980s with the addition of retirement and recreation to its economic base. From a population of 50 before 1950, the lakeside town had grown to 305 by 1974, when it had a post office and numerous businesses. In 2000, the population was still 305; 31 businesses were reported.

Education
Like other small towns surrounding Llano, Tow is served by the Llano Independent School District, but some areas are served by the Burnet Consolidated Independent School District.

See also
Texas Hill Country

References

External links
Handbook of Texas Online
Satellite image from Google Maps

Unincorporated communities in Texas
Unincorporated communities in Llano County, Texas
Populated places established in 1852
1852 establishments in Texas